Phillip T. and Susan M. Ragon Institute is a medical institute founded in 2009 at the Massachusetts General Hospital (MGH) by the funding from founder and CEO of InterSystems Phillip Ragon and his wife Susan Ragon to find vaccines for diseases of the immune system, particularly HIV/AIDS. The institute includes scientists from Harvard University, the Massachusetts Institute of Technology (MIT) and the MGH, a level I trauma center which is the largest teaching hospital affiliated with Harvard Medical School.

The Phillip T. and Susan M. Ragon Institute, or the Ragon Institute of MGH, MIT and Harvard, was officially established in February 2009 with a dual mission: to contribute to the accelerated discovery of an HIV/AIDS vaccine and subsequently to establish itself as a world leader in the collaborative study of immunology.

Aims
Founded with a commitment of $100 million from the Ragons (Phillip T. aka Terry, and Susan), the institute is structured and positioned to significantly contribute to a global effort to successfully develop an HIV/AIDS vaccine through:
 creating non-traditional partnerships among experts with different but complementary backgrounds (e.g., engineers, basic immunologists, computational biologists, immunogeneticists, clinicians);
 providing a means for rapidly funding promising studies (e.g., elite controllers, innovative viral vectors) and emerging concepts in the field (e.g., innate immune system memory);
 integrating key facets of current vaccine development efforts that have tended to follow separate tracks (e.g., seeking a combined antibody and T-cell solution);
 providing a substantial pool of accessible, flexible funding that will help lower the threshold for scientists to pursue risky, unconventional avenues of study that are unlikely to attract funding from traditional sources. Such funding will encourage innovation, compress the time it takes to conduct bench-to-bedside research and attract new minds to the field.

The Ragon Institute's scientific leadership comprises a diverse group of immunologists, geneticists, infectious disease specialists and computational and systems biologists from the MGH, MIT, Harvard, the Broad Institute, Harvard-affiliated hospitals in Boston and from other institutions housing satellite collaborators around the country.

History 
The Ragon Institute was founded in February 2009 through a $100 million gift – the largest gift in Massachusetts General Hospital (MGH) history – from the Phillip T. and Susan M. Ragon Institute Foundation.  Administratively based at MGH, the Ragon Institute incorporates the work of the Partners AIDS Research Center at MGH. Instead of the typical academic approach, in which individual scientists work independently, the Ragon Institute includes engineering disciplines to facilitate novel experimental approaches and incorporate fresh ways of viewing complex biological systems, with the goal of rapidly advancing innovative, interdisciplinary research to revolutionize the field of immunology.

Says Phillip Terrence "Terry" Ragon, "By providing flexible funding and by connecting science and engineering at MIT and Harvard with the research and clinical resources of the MGH, we intend to empower many of the world’s best researchers to focus on what they view as the most promising research. We hope to engage them in a multidisciplinary collaborative effort for which there may be no greater benefit – curing the ill and saving lives." Ragon is founder, owner, and chief executive officer of InterSystems Corporation, a multinational software company based in Cambridge, and Susan Ragon is the company's vice president of Finance and Administration.

In January 2013, Ragon Institute completed its move to 400 Technology Square, Cambridge, Massachusetts.

Facilities 
Researchers, staff, and collaborators occupy approximately 74,675 sq ft of the facility at 400 Technology Square, Cambridge, Massachusetts, consisting of floors 7–10, half the 1st floor, and 3,000 sq ft on the basement level. The building also features a Biosafety Level 3 (BL3) lab, which will provide scientists in the community access to a dedicated 12-color high-speed cell sorter and microscopy. The first floor has a 160-seat auditorium with audio-visual and conferencing capabilities which is used for weekly seminars as well as community events.

References

External links 
 Official website of the Ragon Institute of MGH, MIT, and Harvard

Medical research institutes in Massachusetts
Massachusetts General Hospital
Vaccination-related organizations
HIV/AIDS research organisations
Immunology organizations
Harvard University
Massachusetts Institute of Technology
Non-profit organizations based in Massachusetts
Organizations based in Boston
Science and technology in Massachusetts
Research institutes established in 2009
Scientific organizations established in 2009
2009 establishments in Massachusetts
Vaccination in the United States